Airexpo is a French airshow started in 1987. It is the third most important airshow of France. It is organized by the students of the grandes écoles École nationale de l'aviation civile and those of the Institut Supérieur de l'Aéronautique et de l'Espace. It is held yearly usually on the Muret - Lherm Aerodrome. The 36th edition will take place on May 4, 2022.

Presentation 
The aircraft are representative of the world of aviation, from the Supermarine Spitfire to the F-18, through the little Robin DR400. The airliners are also regularly represented with the participation of Airbus and ATR, with the Airbus A380 and A340-600 or the ATR 72-500.

History

From Lasbordes to Muret 

The first show was held at the Toulouse – Lasbordes Airport. However, with the number of visitors increasing, the association decided to move to Muret - Lherm Aerodrome.

16th and 17th editions (2002-2003) 
The 16th edition welcomed the Patrouille de France 1 June 2002. For the 17th edition, 3 May 2003, the eight Alpha Jets returned.

20th and 21st editions (2006-2007) 
The 20th edition welcomed over 30,000 visitors on 13 May 2006. The 21st edition of Airexpo took place on 12 May 2007 and attracted over 33,000 people.

22nd edition (2008) 
The 22nd edition was organized at the Base aérienne 101 Toulouse-Francazal (Francazal airport) on 25 May 2008. The aircraft Douglas DC-3, Noratlas, Dassault Rafale, Airbus A300-600ST Beluga and A380 were at the airshow.

23rd edition (2009) 
The 23rd edition was organized at the Muret - Lherm Aerodrome on 30 May 2009.
The aircraft at the airshow were:

 Dassault/Dornier Alpha Jet,
 Airbus A380,
 ATR 72,
 North American P-51D Mustang,
 Aérospatiale Alouette III.

24th edition (2010) 
The 24th edition was organized at the Muret - Lherm Aerodrome. More than 30 aircraft were at the airshow, including:
 Airbus A380,
 Airbus Beluga,
 ATR 72 and ATR 42.

Miss France 2010 was also at the airshow.

25th edition (2011) 
The 25th edition took place on 28 May 2011. Twenty flying displays were presented to the public. Presenting at the airshow on the occasion of its 25th anniversary were:
 Breitling Jet Team,
 Red Arrows,
 Eurocopter EC175,
 Airbus A400M,
 Airbus A380,
 Curtiss P-40 Warhawk,
 Mitsubishi A6M Zero,
 Extra EA-300,
 Pitts Special.

26th edition (2012) 
The 26th edition took place on 12 May 2012.

27th edition (2013) 
The 27th edition took place on 8 June 2013 in Muret-Lherm.

28th edition (2014) 
The 28th edition took place on May 31, 2014 in Muret-Lherm.

33rd edition (2019) 
The 33rd edition took place on May 11, 2019 on the airfield of Muret-Lherm.

See also 

Aero India
Air show
Berlin Air Show
Dubai Airshow
Farnborough Airshow
MAKS Airshow
Air/Space America 88
Paris Air Show
List of airshows

References

External links 

 

Air shows
Trade fairs in France
Aviation in France
École nationale de l'aviation civile